The 1987 Reading Borough Council election was held on 7 May 1987, at the same time as other local elections across England and Wales. One third of Reading Borough Council's 45 seats were up for election.

Before the election, the council was under no overall control with Labour running a minority administration, being one seat short of an overall majority. The election saw Labour gain two extra seats, giving it a majority. After the election, Labour had 24 seats, the Conservatives had 16 seats, and the SDP-Liberal Alliance had 5 seats, all of whom were Liberals.

Results

Ward results
The results in each ward were as follows (candidates with an asterisk* were the previous incumbent standing for re-election:

References

1987 English local elections
1987